The 2017 South Africa A Team Tri-Series was a cricket that took place in South Africa in July and August 2017. It was a tri-nation series between South Africa A, Afghanistan A and India A. The one-day matches were played as List A fixtures. Following the List A fixtures, South Africa A and India A played two four-day games with first-class status, also called unofficial Tests.

Originally, Australia A were scheduled to play in the series, but they withdrew in early July following an ongoing pay dispute with Cricket Australia. Later that month, Afghanistan A were named as their replacement, after the national team was awarded Test match status the previous month.

India A won the tri-series, beating South Africa A by 7 wickets in the final of the competition. The first-class series was drawn 1–1, with South Africa A winning the first match and India A winning the second.

List A series

Squads

1st match

2nd match

3rd match

4th match

5th match

6th match

Final

First-class series

Squads

Ravikumar Samarth replaced Abhinav Mukund following the former's selection to the India squad for the Sri Lanka tour.

1st unofficial Test

2nd unofficial Test

References

External links
 List A series home at ESPN Cricinfo
 First-class series home at ESPN Cricinfo

A team cricket
2017 in South African cricket
International cricket competitions in 2017
Indian cricket tours of South Africa
Afghan cricket tours abroad